Sakaemachi Station is the name of train stations in Japan:

Sakaemachi Station (Aichi)
 Sakaemachi Station (Hokkaido)
 Sakaemachi Station (Toyama)

See also
Sakae Station (Aichi) - Named Sakaemachi until 1966
Sakaechō Station (disambiguation) - Train stations in Japan with the same kanji, but different pronunciation

ja:栄町駅